BEI or B.E.I. may refer to :
 Binary ethylenimine, an inactivant used in the inactivation of the foot-and-mouth disease virus
 Business Entity Identifier, an ISO 9362 Bank Identifier Code (BIC) assigned to a non-financial entity
 Balanced Ecology, Inc.
 ), Quebec's police watchdog
 Indonesia Stock Exchange or Bursa Efek Indonesia

See also
 Bei (disambiguation)